Dysphania is a genus of colourful moths in the family Geometridae and typical of the tribe Dysphaniini; they are sometimes called 'false tiger moths' and are found in northeast Australia, Melanesia, and south, east and southeast Asia.

Description 
Most Dysphania are day flying, but there are also nocturnal species.

Species
Species include (incomplete list):
 Dysphania ares (Weymer, 1885)
 Dysphania bivexillata Prout, 1912
 Dysphania cuprina Felder 1874
 Dysphania cyane (Cramer, [1780])
 Dysphania discalis (Walker, 1854)
 Dysphania electra Weymer, 1885
 Dysphania fenestrata Swainson 1833
 Dysphania flavidiscalis Warren, 1895
 Dysphania glaucescens (Walker, 1861)
 Dysphania malayanus (Guérin-Méneville, 1843) - Thailand, western Malesia to Palawan
 Dysphania militaris (Linnaeus, 1758) - India, southern China, Indochina, Malesia
 Dysphania numana (Cramer, [1779]) - type species as Phalaena numana - northern Australia, Kiriwina island
 Dysphania palmyra Stoll, 1790 - Sri Lanka
 Dysphania percota (Swinhoe, 1891) - western India
 Dysphania poeyii (Guérin-Méneville, 1831)
 Dysphania prunicolor Moore, 1879 - India and Sri Lanka
 Dysphania sagana (Druce, 1882) - Indochina, Sumatra
 Dysphania snelleni (Pagenstecher, 1886)
 Dysphania subrepleta (Walker, 1854) - Indochina, western Malesia including Borneo
 Dysphania transducta (Walker, 1861)

References
 Dysphania at Markku Savela's Lepidoptera and Some Other Life Forms
Natural History Museum Lepidoptera genus database

External links
 

Geometrinae